George Allan (18 February 1887 – 2 November 1932) was an Australian cricketer. He played seven first-class matches for Tasmania between 1922 and 1928.

See also
 List of Tasmanian representative cricketers

References

External links
 

1887 births
1932 deaths
Australian cricketers
Tasmania cricketers
Sportspeople from Albury
Cricketers from New South Wales
19th-century Australian people
20th-century Australian people